Metropolis Live is a live mini-album by Serbian hard rock/heavy metal band Trigger, released in 2008. The album was recorded in 2008 on the band's performance in TV Metropolis show Metropolis Live, and features five songs from the band's debut studio album Ljubav. Metropolis Live was available for free digital download on the band's official website.

Track listing
"Navika" – 2:59
"Ti od blata praviš me" – 4:26
"Dobar pas" – 3:58
"Inercija" – 5:08
"Više neće biti nas" – 3:58

Personnel
Milena Branković - vocals
Dušan Svilokos Đurić - guitar, mixing, mastering
Marko Antonić - keyboards
Petar Popović - bass guitar
Yoran Jović - drums

Additional personnel
Dejan Lalić - sound engineering, mixing, mastering
Vladimir Petrović - artwork

References 
Metropolis Live at Discogs

External links 
Metropolis Live at Discogs

Trigger (band) albums
2007 live albums
PGP-RTS live albums